is a prefecture of Japan located in the Kansai region of Honshu. Shiga Prefecture borders Fukui Prefecture to the north, Gifu Prefecture to the northeast, Mie Prefecture to the southeast, and Kyoto Prefecture to the west.

Ōtsu is the capital and largest city of Shiga Prefecture, with other major cities including Kusatsu, Nagahama, and Higashiōmi. Shiga Prefecture encircles Lake Biwa, the largest freshwater lake in Japan, and 37% of the total land area is designated as Natural Parks, the highest of any prefecture. Shiga Prefecture's southern half is located adjacent to the former capital city of Kyoto and forms part of Greater Kyoto, the fourth-largest metropolitan area in Japan. Shiga Prefecture is home to Ōmi beef, the Eight Views of Ōmi, and Hikone Castle, one of four national treasure castles in Japan.

History 

Shiga was known as Ōmi Province or Gōshū before the prefectural system was established.  Omi was a neighbor of Nara and Kyoto, at the junction of western and eastern Japan. During the period 667 to 672, Emperor Tenji founded a palace in Otsu. In 742, Emperor Shōmu founded a palace in Shigaraki. In the early Heian period, Saichō was born in the north of Otsu and founded Enryaku-ji, the center of Tendai and one a UNESCO World Heritage Site and monument of Ancient Kyoto now.

During the Heian period, the Sasaki clan ruled Omi, and afterward the Rokkaku clan, Kyōgoku clan and Azai clans ruled Omi. While during the Azuchi-Momoyama period, Oda Nobunaga subjugated Omi and built Azuchi Castle on the eastern shores of Lake Biwa in 1579. Tōdō Takatora, Gamō Ujisato, Oichi, Yodo-dono, Ohatsu and Oeyo were Omi notables during this period.

In 1600, Ishida Mitsunari, born in the east of Nagahama and based in Sawayama Castle, made war against Tokugawa Ieyasu in Sekigahara, Gifu. After the battle, Ieyasu made Ii Naomasa a new lord of Sawayama. Naomasa established the Hikone Domain, later famous for Ii Naosuke. Ii Naosuke became the Tokugawa shogunate's Tairō and concluded commercial treaties with the Western powers and thus ended Japan's isolation from the world in the 19th century. Besides the Hikone Domain, many domains ruled Omi such as Zeze. With the abolition of the han system, eight prefectures were formed in Omi. They were unified into Shiga Prefecture in September 1872. "Shiga Prefecture" was named after "Shiga District" because Otsu belonged to the district until 1898. From August 1876 to February 1881, southern Fukui Prefecture had been incorporated into Shiga Prefecture.

In 2015, Shiga Governor Taizō Mikazuki conducted a survey asking citizens whether they felt it necessary to change the name of the prefecture, partly to raise its profile as a destination for domestic tourism.

Geography 

Shiga borders Fukui Prefecture in the north, Gifu Prefecture in the east, Mie Prefecture in the southeast, and Kyoto Prefecture in the west.

Lake Biwa, Japan's largest, is located at the center of this prefecture. It occupies one-sixth of its area. The Seta River flows from Lake Biwa to Osaka Bay through Kyoto. This is the only natural river that flows out from the lake. Most other natural rivers flow into the lake. There were many lagoons around Lake Biwa, but most of them were reclaimed in 1940s.

The lake divides the prefecture into four different areas: Kohoku (湖北, north of lake) centered Nagahama, Kosei (湖西, west of lake) centered Imazu, Kotō (湖東, east of lake) centered Hikone and Konan (湖南, south of lake) centered Otsu.

Plains stretch to the eastern shore of Lake Biwa. The prefecture is enclosed by mountain ranges with the Hira Mountains and Mount Hiei in the west, the Ibuki Mountains in the northeast, and the Suzuka Mountains in the southeast. Mount Ibuki is the highest mountain in Shiga.

Shiga's climate sharply varies between north and south. Southern Shiga is usually warm, but northern Shiga is typically cold with high snowfall and hosts many skiing grounds.

As of 1 April 2014, 37% of the total land area of the prefecture was designated as Natural Parks (the highest total of any prefecture), namely the Biwako and Suzuka Quasi-National Parks; and Kotō, Kutsuki-Katsuragawa, and Mikami-Tanakami-Shigaraki Prefectural Natural Parks.

Municipalities

Cities 

Thirteen cities are located in Shiga Prefecture:

Towns 
These are the towns in each district:

Mergers

Politics 

The current governor of Shiga is Taizō Mikazuki, a former member of the House of Representatives from Shiga (DPJ, 3rd district), who was narrowly elected in July 2014 with center-left support against ex-METI-bureaucrat Takashi Koyari (supported by the center-right national-level ruling parties) to succeed governor Yukiko Kada. In June 2018, he was overwhelmingly reelected to a second term against only one, Communist challenger.

The prefectural assembly has 44 members from 16 electoral districts, and is still elected in unified local elections (last round: 2019). As of July 2019, the assembly was composed by caucus as follows: LDP 20 members, Team Shiga (CDP, DPP, former Kada supporters etc.) 14, JCP 4, Sazanami Club (of independents) 3, Kōmeitō 2, "independent"/non-attached 1.

In the National Diet, Shiga is represented by four directly elected members of the House of Representatives and two (one per ordinary election) of the House of Councillors. For the proportional representation segment of the lower house, the prefecture forms part of the Kinki block. After the national elections of 2016, 2017 and 2019, the directly elected delegation to the Diet from Shiga consists of (as of August 1, 2019):
 in the House of Representatives
 for the 1st district in the west: Toshitaka Ōoka, LDP, 3rd term,
 for the 2nd district in the northeast: Ken'ichirō Ueno, LDP, 4th term,
 for the 3rd district on the southern shores of Lake Biwa: Nobuhide Takemura, LDP, 3rd term,
 for the 4th district in the southeast: Hiroo Kotera, LDP, 1st term,
 in the House of Councillors (Shiga At-large district)
 in the class of 2016 (term ends 2022): Takashi Koyari, LDP, 1st term,
 in the class of 2019 (term ends 2025): Yukiko Kada, independent sitting with the Hekisuikai caucus, 1st term.

Economy 

Cultivated areas occupy nearly one-sixth of the prefecture. Rice is the principal crop: over 90 percent of the farmlands are rice fields. Most farms are small, producing only a slight income. Most farmers depend on income from other sources. Eastern Shiga is famous for cattle breeding and southeastern Shiga is famous for green tea. On Lake Biwa, some people are engaged in fishery and freshwater pearl farming.

Since the Medieval Period, especially in Edo period, many Shiga people were active in commerce and were called , sometimes  by other envious merchants. For example, Nippon Life, Itochu, Marubeni, Takashimaya, Wacoal and Yanmar were founded by people from Shiga. In their home towns such as Omihachiman, Hino, Gokashō and Toyosato, their mansions were preserved as tourist attractions.

Beginning in the 1960s, Shiga developed industry, supporting major factories owned by companies such as IBM Japan, Canon, Yanmar Diesel, Mitsubishi, and Toray. According to Cabinet Office's statistics in 2014, the Manufacturing sector accounted for 35.4% of Gross Shiga Product, the highest proportion in Japan. Traditional industries include textiles, Shigaraki ware, Butsudan in Hikone and Nagahama, medicines in Koka, and fan ribs in Adogawa.

Demographics 

The population is concentrated along the southern shore of Lake Biwa in Otsu city (adjacent to Kyoto) and along the lake's eastern shore in cities such as Kusatsu and Moriyama, which are within commuting distance to Kyoto. The lake's western and northern shores are more rural and resort-oriented with white sand beaches. In recent years, many Brazilians settled in Shiga to work in nearby factories. 25,040 foreigners live in Shiga and 30% of foreigners were Brazilians as of December 2016.

Culture 

Biwa Town (now a part of Nagahama) is a home of The Tonda Traditional Bunraku Puppet Troupe. Founded in the 1830s, the group is one of the most active traditional Bunraku puppet theaters in Japan outside the National Theater in Osaka. Toyosato and Higashiomi are known to a mecca of Goshu ondo.

Museums include the Sagawa Art Museum in Moriyama, the Lake Biwa Museum in Kusatsu and the Miho Museum in Kōka. In Kōka, a ninja house is preserved as a visitor center.

Cuisine 
Since ancient times, Shigans have eaten fish from Lake Biwa. It retains the ancient style of sushi and has a pungent odor. Shiga is also famous for high quality wagyū, Ōmi beef. The Hikone Domain presented beef as medicinal food to shōguns. In addition, tsukemono of root crops,  in northern Shiga,  in Omihachiman,  in Nagahama, and lightly seasoned champon in Hikone are examples of specific cuisine in Shiga.

Mass media 
Biwako Broadcasting broadcasts local TV programs. NHK has a broadcasting station in Otsu. Shiga is the only prefecture which has no regional newspapers. Kyoto Shimbun is a de facto regional newspaper of Shiga.

Education 

Ten universities, two junior colleges, and a learning center of The Open University of Japan operate in Shiga.
 Shiga University (Hikone and Ōtsu)
 Shiga University of Medical Science (Otsu)
 University of Shiga Prefecture (Hikone)
 Seian University of Art and Design (Otsu)
 Seisen University (Hikone)
 Nagahama Institute of Bio-Science and Technology (Nagahama)
 Biwako-Gakuin University (Higashiomi)
 Biwako Seikei Sport College (Otsu)
 Ritsumeikan University (Kyoto and Kusatsu)
 Ryukoku University (Kyoto and Otsu)
 Shiga Junior College (Otsu)
 Shiga Bunkyo Junior College (Nagahama)

Sports 
The following sports teams are based in Shiga.

Basketball: Shiga LakeStars
Volleyball: Toray Arrows (women's volleyball team) (Otsu)
Football (soccer): MIO Biwako Kusatsu (Kusatsu), Sagawa Shiga F.C. (Moriyama).
Tennis: SHRIGGA AKA UVEAL

Tourism 

Shiga has many tourism resources, but Shiga is overshadowed by its much more famous neighbor Kyoto. Over four million foreign tourists visited Japan in 2000, but only sixty-five thousand visited Shiga.

The main gateways to Shiga are the Maibara Station in northern Shiga and the city of Ōtsu in the south. The Maibara Station is about 2 hours and 20 minutes away from the Tokyo Station by the Tokaido Shinkansen. It is easy to go to Ōtsu from Kyoto and Osaka by high-speed trains.

Shiga's most prominent feature is Lake Biwa. The northern shore is especially scenic, such as the cherry blossoms of Kaizu Osaki in spring and the sacred island Chikubu-shima. The western shore has white sand beaches, popular among Kyotoites during the summer. The scenery of the southern shore, particularly around Otsu, was selected as Ōmi Hakkei or Eight Views of Ōmi, popularized by Hiroshige's ukiyo-e. Most of the original eight views are now almost gone or changed from centuries ago. One remaining view is the Ukimidō "floating temple" building at Mangetsu-ji temple in Katata, northern Ōtsu. It was reconstructed with concrete in 1937, but a small temple still stands on the lake near the shore, accessible by a short bridge. Another scene features Ishiyama-dera temple in southern Otsu, which is also renowned for having a room where Murasaki Shikibu thought up the plan for some chapters of Tale of Genji.

The mountains around the lake offer extensive views. Mount Hira is a picnic spot. Mountain roads like the Oku-Biwako Parkway road up north and the Hiei-zan Driveway and Oku-Hiei Driveway overlooking the southwestern shore. In Ōtsu, the Ōtsu Prince Hotel's Top of Otsu restaurant provides views of the lake and city. The Michigan paddlewheel boat offers lake cruises.

Besides the natural environment, historical buildings and festivals persons rank among those of national importance. Shiga has 807 National Treasures and Important Cultural Properties, that ranks the fourth large number in Japan. Shiga's most famous historical building is Hikone Castle, one of four national treasure castles in the country. The castle tower is well preserved and has many cherry trees. The neighboring city of Nagahama has tourism in addition to its hikiyama festival. Nearby shrines include Hiyoshi Taisha in Otsu and Taga-taisha in Taga, which respectively head the seventh and twentieth largest shrine networks in Japan, at about 4,000 shrines and 260 shrines, respectively.

Festivals include the hikiyama festival (floats parade festival), held in ten areas such as Nagahama, Otsu, Maibara, Hino and Minakuchi. The Nagahama hikiyama festival held each April is one of the three major hikiyama festivals in Japan and was designated an Important Intangible Cultural Property in 1979. During this festival ornate floats are mounted with miniature stages on which boys (playing both male and female roles) act in kabuki plays. Higashiomi (formerly Yōkaichi) city holds a Giant Kite Festival every May along the riverbank. Ordinary people are invited to pull the rope that sends the kites aloft.

Transportation

Railways 
 West Japan Railway Company
 Tōkaidō Main Line (Biwako Line), Hokuriku Main Line, Kusatsu Line and Kosei Line
 Central Japan Railway Company
 Tōkaidō Shinkansen (Maibara Station) and Tōkaidō Main Line
 Keihan Electric Railway
 Keishin Line and Ishiyama Sakamoto Line
 Ohmi Railway
 Main Line, Yōkaichi Line and Taga Line
 Shigaraki Kōgen Railway
 Sakamoto Cable

Roads 
Meishin Expressway, Shin-Meishin Expressway and Hokuriku Expressway pass through Shiga. National highway Route 1, 8, 21, 8, 161, 303, 306, 307, 365, 367, 421, 422 and 477 connect with neighboring prefectures. Two bridges span southern part of Lake Biwa.

Boats 
With development of land transportation in the 20th century, waterborne transportation in Lake Biwa was disused except for steamer services to islands on the lake and pleasure boats.

Notable people from Shiga Prefecture

 Kakuzo Kawamoto, business executive and politician from Takashima District.
 Gentaro Kawase, president of Nippon Life Insurance from Ōmihachiman
 Takanori Nishikawa, a singer and actor from Hikone and Yasu. He is also active as the first Cultural Ambassador for Shiga.
 Hizaki, a musician and songwriter, known for work as guitarist of Versailles.
 Sōsuke Uno, the 75th prime minister from Moriyama. He was one of the shortest-serving prime ministers in Japan, holding office for only three months (June–August 1989).
 Kizo Yasui, business executive from Hikone, Shiga. Vice-president of Mitsui Bank, president of Mitsui Petroleum and Chemical Industries (now Mitsui Chemicals), chairman of Toray Industries, vice-chairman of Nihon Keidanren (Japan Business Federation), general manager of Tokyo Metropolis of Ise Shrine Revered Board.

Sister states 
Shiga has cooperative agreements with three states.
  Rio Grande do Sul, Brazil
  Michigan, USA (1968)
  Hunan, China

Notes

References
 Nussbaum, Louis-Frédéric and Käthe Roth. (2005).  Japan encyclopedia. Cambridge: Harvard University Press. ;  OCLC 58053128
 Shiga-ken hyakka jiten [Encyclopedia Shiga] (滋賀県百科事典, 1984). Tokyo: Yamato Shobo.

External links 

 
 Shiga Prefecture official page
 go.biwako - Travel Guide of Shiga Prefecture, Japan (Biwako Visitors Bureau)
 Shiga Prefecture Guide - GoJapanGo
 Shiga-ken.com

 
Kansai region
Prefectures of Japan